The Royal Fusiliers War Memorial is a memorial in London, dedicated to the members of the Royal Fusiliers killed in the World Wars, Russian Civil War and subsequent conflicts, along with members of a number of London Regiment  battalions killed in the First World War. It consists of a bronze statue on a  pedestal made of Portland stone.

It was erected in 1922 at Holborn Bar, one of the ancient entry points to the City of London, on a traffic island in the middle of High Holborn, on the City's boundary with the London Borough of Camden, denoted by a dragon boundary mark on either side of the street. The site is near High Holborn's junction with Gray's Inn Road, and is close to the historic Staple Inn.

History

An original intention to erect a memorial to the Royal London Fusiliers in a Royal Park shifted to Hounslow Barracks and then Holborn. A subscription list opened in 1919 and raised £3,000 by August 1920. The monument was unveiled by the Lord Mayor of London on 4 November 1922. The memorial became a Grade II listed structure in 1972, upgraded to Grade II* in July 2017.

Inscriptions
The main inscription is on the west-facing front of the pedestal below a bronze relief of the Tudor Rose from the regimental badge and states the memorial's dedication to the almost 22,000 soldiers of Royal Fusiliers who died during the First World War and Russian Civil War, with later additions commemorating the Royal Fusiliers who died during the Second World War and in subsequent conflicts. A bronze plaque on the pedestal's east-facing reverse lists 47 regular, Territorial, service, reserve, special reserve, extra, garrison and labour battalions of the Royal Fusiliers which served between 1914 and 1919, along with a number of London Regiment battalions whose predecessors had been attached to the Royal Fusiliers prior to 1908.

Statue
It is said to be modelled on a Sergeant Cox, who served throughout the First World War. It depicts a private soldier in service dress, carrying a rifle with fixed bayonet in his right hand, facing along the road to the west to guard the entrance to the City of London. An identical statue is one of five bronze figures by Toft forming a sculpture group for Oldham War Memorial, unveiled in 1923. The same single bronze figure was unveiled in 1932 as the memorial to the 41st Division at Flers, near the site of the Battle of Flers-Courcelette, where tanks were used in battle for the first time on 15 September 1916.

See also
 List of public art in the City of London
 Grade II* listed war memorials in England

Notes

References

 The Royal Fusiliers Memorial, victorianweb.org
 
 The War Memorial at Holborn, The Fusilier Museum London
 41st Division Memorial, Flers, firstworldwar.com

Military memorials in London
World War I memorials in England
World War II memorials in England
1922 sculptures
Bronze sculptures in the United Kingdom
Royal Fusiliers
Royal Regiment of Fusiliers
Sculptures by Albert Toft
Grade II* listed buildings in the City of London
Grade II* listed monuments and memorials